Ingrid Marcella Lacey (born 6 November 1958) is a British actress. She is known for her role as Julia in Series 2 of London's Burning, Helen Cooper in the Channel 4 sitcom Drop the Dead Donkey (1993–98). Her film appearances include Funny Man (1994), In Love and War (1996) and The Cat's Meow (2001).

Career
Lacey is best known for her role as Helen Cooper in Drop the Dead Donkey. She was born in Surrey and educated at Godalming College and trained at the Bristol Old Vic Theatre School, graduating in 1981. She has acted in films, radio, TV series and theatre productions, such as Lolly Susi's Gone to LA at the Hampstead Theatre, London, where she had to shave her head for her role of a woman suffering from breast cancer and in The Knight of the Burning Pestle. She has also appeared at the Royal Court Theatre in the productions "Blood" and "Our Late Night". In 2007 she was in the Bush Theatre's production of "Elling" which transferred to the Trafalgar Studios, while in 2011, she appeared as Tricia in Brad Fraser's 5 @ 50, at the Royal Exchange Theatre, Manchester.

Filmography
 The Cat's Meow (2001) as Jessica Barham
 In Love and War (1996) as Elsie 'Mac' MacDonald
 Funny Man (1994) as Tina Taylor (UK title: Funnyman)

Theatre
 Desdemona: A Play About A Handkerchief (2014) - Emilia (Park Theatre, London)
 The Astronaut's Chair (2012) - Renee (Drum Theatre, Plymouth)
 5 @ 50 (2011) - Tricia (Royal Enchange Theatre, Manchester)
 Elling - (2007) ( Bush Theatre, Trafalgar Studios ), London
 Knight of the Burning Pestle (2005) - Citizen's Wife (Young Vic, London; Mercury Theatre, Colchester)
 Blood (2003) - Madeleine (Royal Court Theatre, London)
 Gone To LA (2000) - Ella (Hampstead Theatre, London)
 Our Late Night (1999) - Kristin (Royal Court Theatre, London)
 After the Rain - (Gate Theatre, Dublin, Ireland)
 The Killing Of Sister George
 Charley's Aunt
 The Comedy Of Errors
 The Lion, The Witch And The Wardrobe as The Witch
 The History Of Mr Polly
 The Resistible Rise Of Arturo Ui
 The Country Wife
 Widowers' Houses (1981) (Bristol Old Vic)
 The Railway Children (Oldham Coliseum)

Television filmography
 New Tricks (2013) as Jane Harlow
 Skins (2011) as Catherine Creevey
 Tracy Beaker Returns - Moving On (episode 13) (2010) as the Editor
 The Bill (2009) as Jilley S. 25 Ep. 10 & 11
 Casualty
 Animals (2005) as Helen Wilder
 Free Fall (1999) as Chrissie Holman
 The Last Detective - episode #1.1 (2003) TV Episode as Roxanne Palmer
 Heartbeat - Honor Among Thieves (1999) as Honor Gale
 Getting Hurt (1998) (TV) as Helen Cross
 Pie in the Sky - Game Pie (1996) TV episode as Cynthia Hoskins
 The Bill - Ties That Bind (1995) as Jane Grant
 Look at the State We're In! (1995) (mini) TV series as Sally
 Master of the Moor (1994) (TV)
 The Chief (UK TV series) (1994) (TV) As Alison Dell
 Drop the Dead Donkey (1990) as Helen Cooper (1993–1998)
 A Woman's Guide to Adultery (1993) (TV) as Helen
 Harry Enfield's Television Programme
 Episode #2.4 (1992)
 Episode #2.5 (1992)
 She-Wolf of London (other title: Love & Curses) - Moonlight Becomes You (1990) TV episode as Diane
 Never Come Back (1990) (TV) as Sarah
 The Endless Game (1990) (TV) as Inga
 Saracen (1989) TV series as Alice
 Inspector Morse - Last Bus to Woodstock (1988) as Mary Widdowson
 The Two of Us - Getting Better (1987) TV episode as Tina
 Northanger Abbey (1987) (TV) as Eleanor Tilney
 Thunder Rock (1985) (TV) as Melanie
 London's Burning (1989)

Radio
 Church Angels
 The Freedom Tapes (1995)
 That Girl In Twenty Seven (1982)

Video game
 Star Wars: Knights of the Old Republic II - The Sith Lords (2004) (VG) (voice) -  Additional voices (US short title: Star Wars: KOTOR II)

References

External links
 
 

English film actresses
English television actresses
English stage actresses
Alumni of Bristol Old Vic Theatre School
Living people
Place of birth missing (living people)
1958 births